The Selma Methodist Church is a historic church located north of AR 4 in the town of Selma, Arkansas. The wood-frame church was built c. 1874, and is a well preserved rural Gothic Revival structure. Its main facade has narrow Gothic windows with pointed arches flanking the center entry, which is topped by a similarly pointed transom. The side walls have five windows each, matching those on the main facade. The apse is located in a half-octagon bay on the north side, whose two windows are also like the others, only shorter.  The main entrance is topped by a small octagonal bell chamber mounted on a square base; there is no steeple.

The building was originally built for a Baptist congregation, which shared the building with the local Methodists after the latter's church was destroyed by fire.  The Methodists acquired the building in 1885.

It was built in a Gothic Revival style and was added to the National Register in 1972.

See also
National Register of Historic Places listings in Drew County, Arkansas

References

Methodist churches in Arkansas
Churches on the National Register of Historic Places in Arkansas
Carpenter Gothic church buildings in Arkansas
Churches in Drew County, Arkansas
National Register of Historic Places in Drew County, Arkansas